Manjeet Kumar Singh is an Indian politician. He was elected to the Bihar Legislative Assembly from Baikunthpur constituency in Bihar in the 2010 Bihar Legislative Assembly election as a member of the Janata Dal (United).

References

Living people
Janata Dal (United) politicians
Samata Party politicians
People from Gopalganj district, India
Bihar MLAs 2010–2015
Year of birth missing (living people)